This is a list of mosques in Indonesia. The Indonesian term Masjid Agung is translated as "Great Mosque", while Masjid Raya is translated as "Grand Mosque." Masjid Keramat is translated as "Holy Mosque." Masjid Jami is translated as Jami Mosque which refers to the congregational mosque where the weekly Friday prayer takes place. These lists only include notable mosques.

List of mosques in Indonesia
As of 2020, a government team led by Fakhry Affan has registered 554,152 mosques in Indonesia. This consists of 258,958 congregational mosques and 295,194 small mosques which fit 40 people or fewer. The government estimates total number of mosques at more than 740,000 nationwide. To be included in this list, the mosque has to be a landmark of a particular region and historically notable.

Largest mosques in Indonesia
Below is a list of large mosques of Indonesia. To be listed here, the building capacity has to accommodate at least 15,000 people.

See also 
Mosque architecture in Indonesia
List of largest mosques

References

External links

Indonesia
Mosques
https://sigupainews.com/pemerintah-abdya-mendukung-sdit-muhammadiyah-atas-kemajuan-pendidikan-agama/